In Sunlight, In a Beautiful Garden is the second novel of the American writer Kathleen Cambor.

A historical novel, its plot is based on the Johnstown Flood of 1889, when more than 2,000 people drowned after the collapse of the South Fork Dam. It accurately portrays the historical figures of the South Fork Fishing and Hunting Club, the industrialists Henry Clay Frick, Andrew Mellon, and Andrew Carnegie, in their cameo roles. The novel features fictional characters, such as Frank Fallon, a steel mill foreman and American Civil War veteran; his son Daniel, a labor organizer; James Talbot, a lawyer hired for the club; and his daughter Nora, an amateur naturalist who believes that the dam, built to provide an Eden for the captains of industry, is likely to fail.

The novel was selected as a New York Times Notable Book of 2001.

References

2001 American novels
Novels set in Pennsylvania
Fiction set in 1889
Novels set in the 1880s
Johnstown, Pennsylvania